Kosa'aay was a Kumeyaay village in what is now Old Town, San Diego.

Etymology
In the Kumeyaay language, Kosa’aay translates to “drying out place”. During Spanish settlement, the name was Hispanicized to Cosoy.

Population
The village was made up of thirty to forty families.

Settlement
The families in this settlement lived in pyramid-shaped housing structures that were supported by a freshwater spring, wetland vegetation and riparian vegetation along the hillsides.

The village provided food and water for the Portolá expedition in 1769 as the crew of the San Carlos and San Antonio were dying of scurvy and thirst. Lieut. Miguel Costanso described being guided by the Kumeyaay to the village as "they arrived on the banks of a river hemmed in on either bank by a fringe of willows and cottonwoods, very leafy...within a musket-shot from the river they discovered a town or village of the same Indians who were guiding our men. It was composed of various huts of pyramidal shape made of branches and covered with earth....The village was composed of 30 or 40 families. On one side of it there was observed an enclosure made of boughs and trunks of trees. Within this, they explained, they took refuge against attacks from their enemies.” The Spanish referred to the village as Cosoy, a hispanized name of Kosa'aay.

Spanish Interactions
On May 15th, 1769, the Spanish erected a hospital camp on Presidio Hill and occupied the water source of the village as well as stationed a permanent garrison at the village upon the recovery of the members of the expedition party after the overland expedition party arrived at the village the day before.

Founding of San Diego
On July 16th, 1769, a Mass was held in the dedication of Mission San Diego de Acalá and El Presidio Real de San Diego, the first mission and presidio in Alta California, and the founding of the settlement of San Diego in Old Town, from which the Kumeyaay village of Kosa'aay was incorporated.

Old Town San Diego State Historic Park 
The village is acknowledged through the Iipay Tipai Kumeyaay Mut Niihepok Park at the Old Town San Diego State Historic Park, which was developed with the Kumeyaay Diegueño Land Conservancy (KDLC) to enhance visibility of Kumeyaay culture and history in the village's original site.

There is also a specialty shop in the state park called Kosay Kumeyaay Market, which sells cultural products from the Kumeyaay and other Yuman groups.

References

History of San Diego
Kumeyaay populated places
Former Native American populated places in California
Kumeyaay